Medford Rogues may refer to:

Medford Rogues (collegiate wood bat baseball)
Medford Rogues (Far West League), a defunct minor league baseball team